Events in the year 1941 in Norway.

Incumbents
Government in Exile (in London)
 Monarch – Haakon VII
 Prime Minister – Johan Nygaardsvold (Labour Party)
German Military Governor
 Reichskommissar in Norway – Josef Terboven

Events

4 March – British Commandos carry out a successful raid on the Lofoten Islands.
21 May – A theatre strike starts in Oslo, spreading to Bergen and Trondheim from the next day, and lasts for five weeks.
27 December – British Commandos raid the port of Vaagso, causing Hitler to reinforce the garrison and defenses, drawing vital troops away from other areas.
 Friheten, a weekly newspaper published by the Norwegian Communist Party, is founded illegally.

Popular culture

Sports

Music

Film

Literature
Thorbjørn Egner – Truls og Kari: en liten bok for store og små

Notable births
 

5 January – Kjell Almskog, businessperson
12 January – John Bjørnebye, diplomat
29 January – Leif Måsvær, politician
24 February – Kari Onstad, singer and actress
13 March – Torgeir Garmo, politician
17 March – Magnus Stangeland, politician
20 March – Atle Kittang, literary researcher and literary critic (died 2013).
25 March – Gudmund Hernes, politician and Minister
3 April – Erik Mollatt, businessperson
8 April – Jan Christiansen, international soccer player and coach
9 April – Ivar Lykke, architect
17 April – Petter Thomassen, politician and Minister (died 2003)
20 April – Åshild Hauan, politician
29 April – Kjell Engebretsen, politician
1 May – Magne Thomassen, speed skater and Olympic silver medallist
13 May – Rolf Skår, engineer.
13 May – Tore Torell, magician (died 2018).
14 May – Ivar Nordkild, biathlete and World Champion.
17 May – Helge Hveem, political scientist and politician
29 May – Inger Aufles, cross country skier and Olympic gold medallist
5 June – Gjermund Eggen, cross country skier and World Champion
19 June – Finn Wagle, bishop
20 June – Odd Bondevik, bishop
29 June – Kjell Risvik, translator (died 2021).
16 July – Dag Solstad, novelist, short-story writer, and dramatist
22 July – Ole Jørgen Benedictow, historian
6 August – Svein Christiansen, jazz drummer (died 2015)
12 August – Egil Tynæs, medical doctor, killed in Afghanistan (died 2004)
21 August – Andreas Hamnes, politician
23 August – Odd Reinsfelt, politician
31 August – Knut Faldbakken, novelist
17 September – Nils Arne Eggen, international soccer player and manager
18 September – Inger-Marie Ytterhorn, politician (died 2021).
2 October – Oddbjørn Snøfugl, politician
26 October – Torgeir Brandtzæg, ski jumper and Olympic bronze medallist
27 October – Gerd Brantenberg, author, teacher and feminist writer
7 November – Lise Skjåk Bræk, textile artist
9 November – Harald Berg, international soccer player
11 November – Hans J. Røsjorde, politician
19 November – Ragna Berget Jørgensen, politician
18 December – Dagfinn Habberstad, trade unionist and civil servant

Full date unknown
Gro Pedersen Claussen, ceramic and textile designer
Jørgen Haugan, author and lecturer
Carl Høgset, choral conductor
Steinar Killi, civil servant
Arne Simonsen, civil servant

Notable deaths
9 January (in England) – Ragnar Vik, sailor and Olympic gold medallist (born 1893).
24 January – Finn Blakstad, farmer and politician (born 1865)
1 August – Waldemar Ager, newspaperman and author in America (born 1869)
10 September – Viggo Hansteen, lawyer and politician, executed (born 1900)
10 September – Rolf Wickstrøm, labour activist, executed (born 1912)
15 November – Fredrik Stang, politician and Minister (born 1867)
3 December – Christian Sinding, composer (born 1856)
27 December – Martin Linge, actor and military commander (born 1894)

Full date unknown
Adolf Agthe, architect (born 1863)
Bernt Holtsmark, politician (born 1859)
Ole Konrad Ribsskog, politician (born 1886)

See also

References

External links